Maliheh-ye Yek (also Romanized as Malīḩeh-ye Yek) is a village in Jahad Rural District, Hamidiyeh District, Ahvaz County, Khuzestan Province, Iran. At the 2006 census, its population was 170, in 27 families.

References 

Populated places in Ahvaz County